Sir Michael Robert Wright, GCMG (3 December 1901 – 10 June 1976) was a British diplomat and politician. He was the British ambassador to Norway from 1951 to 1954 and then to Iraq from 1954 to 1958. He also served in places like the United States, Egypt and France.

In July 1957, he and his wife, Ursula Long were held prisoner by Iraqi rebels at the  British embassy in Baghdad.

Awards and nominations 
Order of St Michael and St George, 1951

References 

1901 births
1976 deaths
Ambassadors of the United Kingdom to Norway
Ambassadors of the United Kingdom to Iraq
Place of birth missing
Knights Grand Cross of the Order of St Michael and St George